Ålleberg is a 330 m high mountain, or table, southeast of Falköping, Sweden.

See also 
Knights of Ålleberg

References 

Mountains of Sweden
Landforms of Västra Götaland County